Edmondsia is a monotypic moth genus of the family Erebidae. Its only species, Edmondsia sypnoides, is found in Chile. Both the genus and the species were first described by Arthur Gardiner Butler in 1882.

References

Calpinae
Monotypic moth genera
Endemic fauna of Chile